Cattleya kerrii ("Kerr's Cattleya") is a species of orchid.

External links

kerrii
kerrii